William Herbert "Harry" Smith, 4th Viscount Hambleden (2 April 1930 – 2 August 2012) was a British peer and descendant of the founders of the stationary group W H Smith.

Life and family
Smith was the son of William Smith, 3rd Viscount Hambleden, and Patricia née Herbert, a descendant of the Earls of Pembroke and the Vorontsov family.  He was educated at Eton College.  He succeeded the title of 4th Viscount Hambleden after the death of his father in 1948.

Smith married Countess Maria Carmela Attolico di Adelfia in 1955. The couple had five sons:
William Henry (b. 1955)
Bernardo James (b. 1957)
Alexander David (b. 1959)
Nicolas Robin Bartolomeo (b. 1960)
Lorenzo Patrick Harold (b. 1962)

After the couple's divorce in 1988, Smith married Lesley Watson and lived in America, while his first wife continued to live in the Manor House in Hambleden, Buckinghamshire, England.  He sold off most of the family estate in 2007.

Smith died of cancer on 2 August 2012 at his home in Reno, Nevada, at the age of 82. His funeral was held on 31 August 2012 at St. Mary the Virgin, Hambleden.  Upon his death, his eldest son succeeded his title.

References

1930 births
2012 deaths
People educated at Eton College
Deaths from cancer in Nevada
Viscounts in the Peerage of the United Kingdom

Hambleden